This is a list of events in British radio during 1992.

Events

January
6 January – 
Brian Hayes takes over The Radio 2 Breakfast Show from Derek Jameson.
The first edition of The AM Alternative is broadcast on BBC Radio 5. The new programme, presented by Johnnie Walker, is on air every weekday and replaces the three separate shows - This Family Edition, Sound Advice and The Health Show - which had previously occupied the mid-morning slot.

February
 11 February – Airport Information Radio closes. The station had provided a travel news service for people using Heathrow and Gatwick airports since 1990.
15 February – Radio Orwell changes its name to SGR FM following the purchase of the station by East Anglian Radio.
17 February – Danny Baker replaces Sarah Ward and Jon Briggs as presenter of Radio 5's weekday breakfast programme Morning Edition.
21 February – Ahead of a schedule revamp, Gary Davies presents his final 'bit in the middle' on BBC Radio 1. He had presented the weekday lunchtime show for the station since 1984. He is replaced on 24 February by Jakki Brambles. The new schedule sees Gary moving to the weekends, including presenting the weekend breakfast show.
29 February – BBC Radio 3 stops broadcasting on MW. Its frequency is to be used by a national commercial station.

March
 1 March – 
Commercial radio comes to Lincolnshire, with the launch of Lincs FM.
Mark Goodier ends his first stint as presenter of BBC Radio 1's Complete UK Top 40.
 6 March – Round Table is broadcast on BBC Radio 1 for the final time.
 9 March – BBC Radio 1 undergoes a schedule revamp, with most of the changes being to the weekend schedule, and a new jingles package is introduced based on the theme Closer to the Music.
15 March – 
Chris Evans makes his BBC Radio 1 debut, presenting a short-lived Sunday early afternoon show called Too Much Gravy.
Bruno Brookes returns as host of BBC Radio 1’s Complete UK Top 40. The programme is extended once again and now airs from 4 pm until 7 pm.
23 March – BBC Radio Nottingham ends transmissions on one of its MW transmitters. BBC Radio Cleveland and BBC GLR also stop broadcasting on MW at around the same time.
late March-7 April – For the first time BBC Radio 4 on long wave opts out of the main Radio 4 schedule to provide extra news coverage. It does so to provide additional coverage of the latest developments in the general election campaign. Before now, these programmes would have been broadcast on the station's FM frequencies.

April
 3 April – Commercial radio comes to Cornwall, with the launch of Pirate FM.
 20 April – The Freddie Mercury Tribute Concert for AIDS Awareness, an open-air concert in tribute to the late Freddie Mercury is held at London's Wembley Stadium. The concert is broadcast on BBC2 and BBC Radio 1 in the UK, and televised worldwide.
April – The Radio Authority awards the second Independent National Radio licence to Independent Music Radio, a consortium jointly owned by TV-am and Virgin Communications Ltd. The Authority had hoped that the station would launch by the end of the year but it didn’t launch until the following April.

May
20 May – Ball-by-ball cricket commentary moves to BBC Radio 3's FM frequencies for the summer following the switching-off of BBC Radio 3's MW frequency.

June
10–26 June – For the first time, the BBC provides full radio coverage of an international football tournament when it broadcasts live commentary of every game of Euro 92 on BBC Radio 5.
22 June – Radio Wimbledon broadcasts for the first time, providing coverage of the Wimbledon tennis championships. The service broadcasts as a Restricted Service Licence and is available within a 5-mile radius of the AELTC.
28 June – BBC Radio 2 provides fifteen hours of coverage of the first annual National Music Day, presented by Ken Bruce.

July
 4 July – Commercial radio comes to North Yorkshire, with the launch of Minster FM.
13 July – In a bid to counter-act the forthcoming launch of Classic FM, BBC Radio 3 makes major changes to its programmes, including the launch of new weekday breakfast and drivetime programmes. On Air replaces the weekday editions of Morning Concert and In Tune replaces Mainly for Pleasure.
17 July – As part of the Radio 3 changes, a new three-hour Sunday morning show of popular classics launches, introduced by Brian Kay.
25 July – BBC Radio 4 stops the week for the final time, after having done so since 1974.
26 July – 9 August – Radio 5 provides full live coverage of the 1992 Summer Olympic Games. Programmes run all day, from 6.30 am until 10 pm. This is the first time that BBC Radio has provided full coverage of the Games.
 July – As Classic FM prepares to launch, test transmissions are carried out using a recording of birdsong originally made for a Raymond Briggs play about nuclear war in 1991. The recording proves popular with listeners and from 2003 to 2005 and again from 2008 until 2009 the recording became part of a full-time station called Birdsong Radio.

August
 30 August – 100,000 people attend BBC Radio 1's biggest ever Roadshow to celebrate the 25th anniversary of Radio 1. The event, held at Sutton Park in the West Midlands, features live performances from bands including Del Amitri, Aswad, The Farm and Status Quo.

September
 7 September – At 6 am, Britain's first national commercial radio station, Classic FM, is launched.

October
 15 October – 
Commercial radio comes to the Channel Islands, with the launch of Island FM, followed 10 days later by the start of Channel 103.
The BBC announces plans to launch a continuous news service on BBC Radio 4’s long wave frequency. The date of 5th April 1994 is set as the launch date.
 18 October – After previously enjoying success as a pirate radio station, Sunshine 855 in Shropshire officially goes on air.

November
No events.

December
 23 December – Brian Hayes presents The Radio 2 Breakfast Show for the final time. He is succeeded by Terry Wogan in January 1993.
 27 December – Pick of the Pops is broadcast on BBC Radio 1 for the final time.
 31 December – Radio Luxemburg ceases to broadcast English programming shortly after 1 am, doing so exactly one year after the station had stopped broadcasting on MW.

Unknown
 The BBC World Service starts to be broadcast on BBC Local Radio when stations are not on the air. Previously, BBC Radio 2 had been heard during station downtime.

Station debuts
21 January – BBC Radio Berkshire
 1 March – Lincs FM
14 March – Heartland FM
 3 April – Pirate FM
14 April – The Worlds Greatest Music Station
4 May – Mercury 96.4
 25 May – Radio Wave 96.5
22 June – Radio Wimbledon
 1 July – KL.FM 96.7
 4 July – Minster FM
1 September – Q96
5 September – Spire FM
 7 September – Classic FM
15 September – Sunrise East Midlands
15 October – Island FM
18 October – Sunshine 855
25 October – Channel 103
12 December – Lantern FM
14 December – Radio Ceredigion

Changes of station frequency

Closing this year
 11 February – Airport Information Radio
 30 December – Radio Luxembourg (1933–1992)

Programme debuts
 9 January – 
 No Commitments on BBC Radio 4 (1992–2007)
 Room 101 on BBC Radio 5 (1992–1994)
 15 September – Night Waves (Free Thinking from 2014) on BBC Radio 3 (1992–Present)
 9 October – The Mark Steel Solution on BBC Radio 5 (BBC Radio 4 from Series 2) (1992–1996)
 1 December – Knowing Me Knowing You with Alan Partridge on BBC Radio 4 (1992–1993)

Continuing radio programmes

1940s
 Sunday Half Hour (1940–2018)
 Desert Island Discs (1942–Present)
 Letter from America (1946–2004)
 Woman's Hour (1946–Present)
 A Book at Bedtime (1949–Present)

1950s
 The Archers (1950–Present)
 The Today Programme (1957–Present)
 Sing Something Simple (1959–2001)
 Your Hundred Best Tunes (1959–2007)

1960s
 Farming Today (1960–Present)
 In Touch (1961–Present)
 The World at One (1965–Present)
 The Official Chart (1967–Present)
 Just a Minute (1967–Present)
 The Living World (1968–Present)
 The Organist Entertains (1969–2018)

1970s
 PM (1970–Present)
 Start the Week (1970–Present)
 Week Ending (1970–1998)
 You and Yours (1970–Present)
 I'm Sorry I Haven't a Clue (1972–Present)
 Good Morning Scotland (1973–Present)
 Kaleidoscope (1973–1998)
 Newsbeat (1973–Present)
 The News Huddlines (1975–2001)
 File on 4 (1977–Present)
 Money Box (1977–Present)
 The News Quiz (1977–Present)
 Breakaway (1979–1998)
 Feedback (1979–Present)
 The Food Programme (1979–Present)
 Science in Action (1979–Present)

1980s
 In Business (1983–Present)
 Sounds of the 60s (1983–Present)
 Loose Ends (1986–Present)

1990s
 Jazz Parade (1990–1993)
 Formula Five (1990–1994)
 The Moral Maze (1990–Present)
 Essential Selection (1991–Present)

Ending this year
 28 May – On the Hour (1991–1992)
 25 July – Stop the Week (1974–1992)
 4 August – Flying the Flag (1987–1992)
 22 August – Flywheel, Shyster, and Flywheel (1990–1992)
 13 December – Down Your Way (1946–1992)

See also 
 1992 in British music
 1992 in British television
 1992 in the United Kingdom
 List of British films of 1992

References

Radio
British Radio, 1992 In
Years in British radio